The Social Liberals (SoL) is a minor social liberal political party in Austria.  It has never won a seat in a federal election.

Formation
The party was founded and its charter registered and deposited at the Federal Ministry of the Interior, as required by Austrian law, on March 11, 2002. It has not yet contested any Austrian federal election.

Alliances
The debate about the party-programme began in earnest after the controversial 2002 parliamentary elections, which brought to power a centre-right government. The SoL regards itself as a left liberal or libertarian left party with social democratic leftist leanings. The party has contacts with the Italian Radicals, the Belgian Vivant party, as well as the German party Liberale Demokraten – Die Sozialliberalen.

The Social Liberals see an affinity with the Danish Det Radikale Venstre and the Dutch Democrats 66 (D66). The SoL has stated its interest in an alliance with other leftist parties, within Austria and abroad.

Aims
In 2004, the party was led by the lawyer Edith Gagern, Brigitte Mahel and Stephan Neuhäuser.

The Social Liberals have various aims: they see themselves in the tradition of humanism, promoting a life free of ideology or doctrine. They want
 sustainable development and environmental protection
 transparency and more streamlining in the political decision-making process, both domestically and in the European Union
 the introduction of a nationwide basic income
 a social and just market economy 
 the keeping of Austria's neutrality and a 
 strong engagement for peace-initiatives, human rights, and solidarity with the destitute, refugees, and asylum-seekers.

The Social Liberals also want to see the voting system changed from the current party-list proportional representation to proportional representation, in order to give smaller parties a chance.

See also 
 Contributions to liberal theory
 Liberalism
 Liberal democracy
 Liberalism in Austria
 Liberalism worldwide
 List of liberal parties
 Social liberalism

References

External links

Liberal parties in Austria
Social liberal parties
2002 establishments in Austria
Political parties established in 2002